Zenith Komarniski (born August 13, 1978) is a Canadian former ice hockey player who played in the National Hockey League for the Vancouver Canucks and the Columbus Blue Jackets.

Playing career
He played junior hockey for the Tri-City Americans of the Western Hockey League from 1994-1995 until early in the 1997–1998 season, when he was traded to the Spokane Chiefs. While at Tri-City, he was drafted in the 1996 NHL Entry Draft, 75th overall, by the Vancouver Canucks.

He began his professional playing career in the American Hockey League during the 1998-1999 season with the Syracuse Crunch, at that time the AHL affiliate of the Vancouver Canucks. He played most of the 1999-2000 season for Syracuse, but also appeared in 18 games for the Canucks. In his eighth game for the Canucks, he scored his first and only NHL goal on a shot from centre-ice against Patrick Roy of the Colorado Avalanche. He would not play another NHL game until the 2002–2003 season, spending the better part of three years on both the Kansas City Blades, the Canucks' IHL affiliate before the league disbanded, and the Manitoba Moose of the AHL. Midway through the 2003–2004 season, he was traded from Vancouver to the Columbus Blue Jackets. He split the season between Manitoba and Syracuse, the AHL affiliate of the Blue Jackets. He also played two games with Columbus later in the year. During the 2004–2005 lockout season, he played at Syracuse, but signed in the off-season for the Calgary Flames, and played the 2005–2006 season in Omaha, the Flames' AHL affiliate.

Career statistics

Regular season and playoffs

International

Awards
 Named to the WHL West First All-Star Team in 1997.

References

External links
 

1978 births
Living people
Canadian ice hockey defencemen
Columbus Blue Jackets players
Ice hockey people from Edmonton
Kansas City Blades players
Manitoba Moose players
Omaha Ak-Sar-Ben Knights players
Spokane Chiefs players
Syracuse Crunch players
Tri-City Americans players
Vancouver Canucks draft picks
Vancouver Canucks players